Greenlaw is an unincorporated community in Tangipahoa Parish, Louisiana, United States. The community is located   N of Amite City, Louisiana.

Name origin
The community is named after a local sawmill owned by Edward Runnels Greenlaw who owned and operated the Greenlaw Lumber Company.

References

Unincorporated communities in Tangipahoa Parish, Louisiana
Unincorporated communities in Louisiana